Nievergelt is a Swiss surname. It may refer to the following:
 Ernst Nievergelt (1910–1999), Swiss cyclist
 Erwin Nievergelt (1929–2019), Swiss chess player

German-language surnames